Svantepolk Knutsson (died ca. 1310) was a Swedish  knight and councilor. He became a wealthy feudal lord  in Östergötland.

Biography
His father was Knud Valdemarsen  (ca. 1205-1260), Duke of Revelia, Blekinge and Lolland.
His father was an  illegitimate son of King Valdemar II of Denmark (1170–1241) His mother was a Pomeranian whose first name is not known, but who is indicated to have come from the ducal family of Pomerelia. The name Svantepolk may have recalled some maternal relative of Slavic princely dynasties. His brother was Eric, Duke of Halland. 

Svantepolk settled at Viby in Östergötland in the late-13th century. He was a knight and councilor from about 1290.  His manor was located in Östra Ryd, a parish of Söderköping.   He became justiciar (lagman) of Östergötland.

His wife was Benedicta of Bjelbo (d. 1261), daughter of Sune Folkesson (d. 1247),  grandson of earl Birger Brosa (d. 1202).
Benedicta's mother was Helena Sverkersdotter, the daughter of King Sverker II of Sweden and his first wife Benedicta Ebbesdotter of Hvide (d. ca. 1200). She was the sister of Queen Catherine Sunesdotter (c. 1215 – 1252),  wife of King Eric XI of Sweden.

Svantepolk Knutsson was the father of  Ingrid Svantepolksdotter (d. ca.1350), wife of  Folke Algotsson (d. ca. 1310) and later  abbess of   Vreta Abbey. 
They were the parents of  Swedish councilor Knut Folkesson (d. 1348). 

Svantepolk and Benedicta's daughters married lords of Swedish high nobility and became ancestresses of several Swedish noble families, bringing substantial dowries.

References

1310 deaths
Lawspeakers
Swedish people of Danish descent
Swedish people of Polish descent
Year of birth unknown
People from Östergötland
13th-century Swedish nobility